Neilson Voyne Smith FBA (born 1939), known as Neil Smith, is Emeritus Professor of Linguistics at University College London.

He wrote his PhD (1964) on the grammar of Nupe, a language of Nigeria. Since then his research has encompassed theoretical syntax, language acquisition, the savant syndrome, and general linguistic theory, particularly the work of Noam Chomsky.

In the 1990s he began working with an autistic man, Christopher, in collaboration with Ianthi-Maria Tsimpli. According to Smith and Tsimpli, Christopher has a non-verbal IQ of between 60 and 70, but his English is comparable to that of normal native speakers, and he has an extraordinary ability to learn new languages.

Smith was Head of the Department of Phonetics and Linguistics at University College London from 1983 to 1990, and headed the Linguistics section from 1972 until his retirement in 2006, when he was presented with a Festschrift Language in Mind: A Tribute to Neil Smith on the Occasion of his Retirement (edited by Robyn Carston, Diane Blakemore and Hans van de Koot).

Honours
Smith was elected a Fellow of the British Academy (FBA) in 1999. He was made an Honorary Member of the Linguistic Society of America in 2000.

Selected works
An Outline Grammar of Nupe (Luzac, 1967)
The Acquisition of Phonology (Cambridge University Press, 1973)
Modern Linguistics: The Results of Chomsky's Revolution (with Deirdre Wilson; Penguin, 1979)
The Twitter Machine: Reflections on Language (Blackwell, 1989)
The Mind of a Savant (with Ianthi-Maria Tsimpli; Blackwell, 1995)
Chomsky: Ideas and Ideals (Cambridge University Press, 1999; second edition 2004; third edition, with Nicholas Allott, 2016)
Language, Bananas and Bonobos: Linguistic Problems, Puzzles and Polemics (Blackwell, 2002)
Language, Frogs and Savants: More Linguistic Problems, Puzzles and Polemics (Blackwell, 2005)
Acquiring Phonology: A Cross-generational Case-study (Cambridge University Press, 2010)
The Signs of a Savant (with Gary Morgan, Ianthi-Maria Tsimpli and Bencie Woll) (Cambridge University Press, 2011)

References

External links
Autobiographical article, in LinguistList's famous linguists series

1939 births
Living people
Linguists from the United Kingdom
Fellows of the British Academy
Alumni of the University of Cambridge
Alumni of University College London
Academics of University College London
British phonologists